
Year 233 (CCXXXIII) was a common year starting on Tuesday (link will display the full calendar) of the Julian calendar. At the time, it was known as the Year of the Consulship of Claudius and Paternus (or, less frequently, year 986 Ab urbe condita). The denomination 233 for this year has been used since the early medieval period, when the Anno Domini calendar era became the prevalent method in Europe for naming years.

Events 
 By place 
 Roman Empire 
 Emperor Alexander Severus celebrates a triumph in Rome to observe his "victory" the previous year over the Persians (in reality, Severus Alexander advanced towards Ctesiphon in 233, but as corroborated by Herodian, his armies suffered a humiliating defeat against Ardashir I).   He is soon summoned to the Rhine frontier, where the Alamanni invade what is now modern-day Swabia. German tribes destroy Roman forts, and plunder the countryside at the Limes Germanicus.

Births 
 Chen Shou, Chinese historian and writer of the Records of the Three Kingdoms (d. 297)

Deaths 
 June 13 – Cao Rui, Chinese imperial prince of the Cao Wei state
 Liu Ji, Chinese official and politician of the Eastern Wu state (b. 185)
 Yu Fan, Chinese official and politician of the Eastern Wu state (b. 164)

References